Sandra Kelly (born April 13, 1949) is a Canadian former elected official. She sat in the Newfoundland and Labrador House of Assembly from 1996 to 2003 as a member of the Liberals. She served as the Minister of Tourism, Culture and Recreation and the Minister of Industry, Trade, and Technology. She represented the electoral district of Gander.

The daughter of Hardy West and Doris Wellon, she was born Sandra West in Gander and was educated there, at the General Hospital School of Nursing in St. John's and at Dalhousie University, where she received a diploma in community health nursing. In 1970, she married Ronald Patrick Kelly. She was Mayor of Gander from 1993 to 1996.

She was elected to the Newfoundland assembly in 1996 and re-elected in 1999. She chose not to run for re-election in 2003.

References

Living people
1949 births
Mayors of Gander, Newfoundland and Labrador
Liberal Party of Newfoundland and Labrador MHAs
Women MHAs in Newfoundland and Labrador
Women mayors of places in Newfoundland and Labrador
21st-century Canadian politicians
21st-century Canadian women politicians